Semipodolaspis is an extinct genus of jawless fish.

References 

 Voichyshyn, V. (2011). "The Early Devonian armoured agnathans of Podolia, Ukraine". Palaeontologia Polonica 66: 1–211. 

Pteraspidiformes genera